In mathematics, the equivariant algebraic K-theory is an algebraic K-theory associated to the category  of equivariant coherent sheaves on an algebraic scheme X with action of a linear algebraic group G,  via Quillen's Q-construction; thus, by definition,

The theory was developed by R. W. Thomason in 1980s. Specifically, he proved equivariant analogs of fundamental theorems such as the localization theorem.

(Hence, the equivariant K-theory is a specific case of the K-theory of a stack.)

A version of the Lefschetz fixed-point theorem holds in the setting of equivariant (algebraic) K-theory.

Fundamental theorems 
Let X be an equivariant algebraic scheme.

Examples 
One of the fundamental examples of equivariant K-theory groups are the equivariant K-groups of -equivariant coherent sheaves on a points, so .

Torus ring 

See also
 Topological K-theory, the topological equivariant K-theory

References 

N. Chris and V. Ginzburg, Representation Theory and Complex Geometry, Birkhäuser, 1997.

 Thomason, R.W.:Algebraic K-theory of group scheme actions. In: Browder, W. (ed.) Algebraic topology and algebraic K-theory. (Ann. Math. Stud., vol. 113, pp. 539 563) Princeton: Princeton University Press 1987 
 Thomason, R.W.: Lefschetz–Riemann–Roch theorem and coherent trace formula. Invent. Math. 85, 515–543 (1986) 
 Thomason, R.W., Trobaugh, T.: Higher algebraic K-theory of schemes and of derived categories. In: Cartier, P., Illusie, L., Katz, N.M., Laumon, G., Manin, Y., Ribet, K.A. (eds.) The Grothendieck Festschrift, vol. III. (Prog. Math. vol. 88, pp. 247 435) Boston Basel Berlin: Birkhfiuser 1990
 Thomason, R.W., Une formule de Lefschetz en K-théorie équivariante algébrique, Duke Math. J. 68 (1992), 447–462.

Further reading 
Dan Edidin, Riemann–Roch for Deligne–Mumford stacks, 2012

Algebraic K-theory